The Fleetwings BQ-2 was an early expendable unmanned aerial vehicle — referred to at the time as an "assault drone" — developed by Fleetwings during the Second World War for use by the United States Army Air Forces. Only a single example of the type was built; the aircraft was deemed too expensive for service and was cancelled after a brief flight testing career.

Development
Development of the BQ-2 began on July 10, 1942, under a program for the development of "aerial torpedoes" – unmanned flying bombs – that had been instigated in March of that year. Fleetwings was contracted to build a single XBQ-2 assault drone, powered by two Lycoming XO-435 horizontally opposed piston engines, and fitted with a fixed landing gear in tricycle configuration; the landing gear was jettisonable for better aerodynamics.

The BQ-2 was optionally piloted; a single-seat cockpit was installed for ferry and training flights; a fairing would replace the cockpit canopy on operational missions. A single BQ-1 was to be constructed as well under the same contract.

Flight testing
The XO-435 engines were dropped from the design of the XBQ-2 before completion, being replaced by two Lycoming R-680 radial engines, with the aircraft being redesignated XBQ-2A.

Following trials of the television-based command guidance system using a PQ-12 target drone, the XBQ-2A flew in mid 1943; following flight trials, the design was determined to be too expensive for operational use, and the program was cancelled in December of that year.

Specifications (XBQ-2A)

See also

References

Notes

Bibliography

BQ-2
1940s United States bomber aircraft
Unmanned aerial vehicles of the United States
World War II guided missiles of the United States
Cancelled military aircraft projects of the United States
High-wing aircraft
Aircraft first flown in 1943
Twin piston-engined tractor aircraft